Chespiritos is a genus of flies of mostly neotropical distribution, belonging to the family Sphaeroceridae (lesser dung flies).

Species
C. anguineus  (Bolivia)
C. attenboroughi  (Argentina; named after David Attenborough)
C. balrogiformis  (Peru; named after Balrogs)
C. bolanosi  (Mexico; named after Roberto Gómez Bolaños)
C. calceus  (Peru)
C. chicobrazos  (Costa Rica)
C. coronatus  (Bolivia, Brazil, Colombia, Costa Rica, Ecuador, Trinidad)
C. dolabratus  (Costa Rica)
C. elephantus  (Ecuador, Peru)
C. extendido  (Bolivia, Colombia, Costa Rica, Ecuador, Mexico, Panama, Venezuela)
C. ganchopico  (Argentina, Bolivia, Ecuador, Panama, Tobago)
C. gladiator  (Costa Rica)
C. hojagrande  (Costa Rica, Mexico)
C. jamaicensis  (Jamaica)
C. lepustergum  (Costa Rica, Venezuela)
C. metroidiformis  (Costa Rica; named after Metroids)
C. paraiso  (Dominican Republic) 
C. peckorum  (Ecuador)
C. pervadens  (Brazil and the Canary Islands)
C. sindecimus  (Costa Rica)
C. ventrisetis  (Brazil, Costa Rica, Venezuela)

References

Sphaeroceridae
Diptera of South America
Diptera of North America
Brachycera genera